Remo Arnold (born 17 January 1997) is a Swiss footballer who plays for FC Winterthur in the Swiss Challenge League, that is the second tier of football in the country.

External links
 Swiss Super League profile
 
 SFV U16
 SFV U17
 SFV U18
 SFV U19
 SFV U20
 SFV U21

Living people
1997 births
People from Sursee District
Swiss men's footballers
Switzerland youth international footballers
Association football midfielders
Swiss Super League players
Swiss Challenge League players
FC Luzern players
FC Winterthur players
Sportspeople from the canton of Lucerne